Otto Detlev Creutzfeldt (1 April 1927 – 23 January 1992) was a German physiologist and neurologist. He was the son of Hans Gerhard Creutzfeldt and the younger brother of Werner Creutzfeldt, a professor of internal medicine.

Career

A remarkable career made Creutzfeldt a renowned
researcher. 
Creutzfeldt attended the gymnasium (high school) in Kiel.  At university 
he first studied the humanities, but soon switched to medicine, and obtained his M.D. at 
Freiburg University in Germany in 1953. From 1953 and 1959 he was an assistant and trainee in
physiology with Prof. Hoffmann (Freiburg), in psychiatry with Prof.
Miiller (Bern), and in neurophysiology and neurology with Prof. Jung
(Freiburg).  He continued to work for two years as a research
anatomist at UCLA Medical School before moving to the
Max Planck Institute for Psychiatry in Munich, where he stayed from
1962 to 1971. Creutzfeldt obtained there his degree in clinical
neurophysiology (University of Munich). In 1971 he became one of the 
nine directors of the Max Planck Institute for Biophysical Chemistry, as head of the Department
of Neurobiology.

Awards 

1992 The K-J. Zülch Prize of the Gertrud Reemtsma Foundation awarded posthumously for "Neurophysiology of neuronal correlates of higher behavioral performance, particularly of sight and speech.

The Otto-Creutzfeldt-Lecture 

Creutzfeldt had a profound impact on neuroscience, in particular in Germany, for he had an unusually 
large number of pupils who held chairs in German universities, Max Planck Institutes
and, Leibniz Institutes.  From 1992 a lecture is given yearly, and from 1999 biennial, by distinguished scientists to his honour at the University of Göttingen during the  Meeting of the German Neuroscience Society ("The Otto-Creutzfeldt-Lecture").

 1992 Bert Sakmann, Recordings of excitatory and inhibitory currents from visual cortex neurons: An effort lasting 25 years
 1993 Heinz Wässle, Vision in darkness: The rod circuit of the mammalian retina
 1994 Wolf Singer, The putative role of response synchronization in neocortical processing
 1995 Henning Scheich, Auditory cortex: pattern analyzer and interpreter
 1996 Klaus-Peter Hoffmann, Evolution of motion perception and slow eye movement control in mammals
 1997 Semir Zeki, The conscious vision of the blind and the modularity of consciousness
 1998 Terry Sejnowski, Computational neurobiology of sleep, and by Eric Kandel, Genes, synapses and long-term memory
 1999 Gerhard Neuweiler, Hearing in echolocating bats, a paradigm for mammalian audition?
 2003 Eckart O. Altenmüller, From Laetoli to Carnegie: musician's brains and neuroplasticity
 2007 Uwe Heinemann, Cellular mechanisms of memory consolidation in the hippocampal formation
 2009 Atsushi Iriki, Neuroscience of Primate Intellectual Evolution
 2011 Jan Born, The memory function of sleep
 2013 Hannelore Ehrenreich, Shifting paradigms in neuropsychiatry
 2015 Sabine Kastner, Perceptual and cognitive functions of the thalamus

Bibliography

Creutzfeldt O.D. (1983) Cortex cerebri. Springer, Berlin
Heidelberg New York

References

German physiologists
1927 births
1992 deaths
German neuroscientists
University of Freiburg alumni
Ludwig Maximilian University of Munich alumni
Max Planck Institute directors
Max Planck Society alumni
People from Berlin